Sir Charles Frederick Adermann,  (3 August 1896 – 9 May 1979) was an Australian politician who served in the House of Representatives from 1943 to 1972, representing the Country Party. He was the party's deputy leader from 1964 to 1966 and served as Minister for Primary Industry from 1958 to 1967. He was a peanut farmer before entering politics.

Early life
Adermann was born on 3 August 1896 at Vernor Siding near Lowood, Queensland. He was the eighth child of German immigrant parents Emilie (née Litzow) and Carl Friederich Adermann. His younger brother Ernest Aderman(n) became a member of parliament in New Zealand. Adermann grew up in Wooroolin where his parents established the first local branch of the Churches of Christ. He attended state schools until the age of 13, and later studied farm management by correspondence. During the First World War, he was rejected for military service on medical grounds, attempting to enlist after his brother Robert was killed in action in 1916.

Adermann became a leader of the South Burnett farming community. He served as chairman of the Peanut Board from 1925 to 1931 and 1934 to 1952, overseeing the establishment of a compulsory collective marketing system which processed, stored, and sold crops on behalf of peanut growers. Adermann married Mildred Turner in 1926, with whom he had two sons and two daughters. In 1938, he began a series of Sunday school radio broadcasts on 4SB under the name "Uncle John".

Political career

Adermann was elected as a Country Party member for Maranoa at the 1943 election, defeating one-term Labor incumbent Frank Baker.  He was one of the few bright spots in a disastrous election for the Coalition, which took only 19 seats.  Adermann was the only Coalition challenger to oust a Labor incumbent, and was one of only seven Country MPs elected nationwide.  However, Maranoa had historically been a safely conservative seat, and he was reelected with a handsome majority in 1946.

A redistribution carved the new seat of Fisher out of some of the eastern portion of Maranoa, and Adermann transferred there for the 1949 election.  He served as chairman of committees from 1950 to 1958. He was appointed Minister for Primary Industry in the Menzies ministry in December 1958 and was admitted to Cabinet in February 1960.  He was responsible for granting additional assistance to rural producers. In 1964 he became Deputy Leader of the Country Party, a position he held until 1966.  He was dropped from the ministry in 1967.  He retired from parliament at the 1972 election and handed his seat to his son, Evan.

Adermann was appointed a privy counsellor in 1966 and a knight of the Order of the British Empire in 1971. He died in Dalby, survived by his wife, two sons and two daughters.

Sir Charles' grandson Greg Adermann was elected LNP Councillor for  Pullenvale Ward of the Brisbane City Council in 2020.

See also
Politics of Australia

References

National Party of Australia members of the Parliament of Australia
Members of the Cabinet of Australia
Members of the Australian House of Representatives for Maranoa
Members of the Australian House of Representatives for Fisher
Members of the Australian House of Representatives
Australian Knights Commander of the Order of the British Empire
Australian politicians awarded knighthoods
Australian members of the Privy Council of the United Kingdom
1896 births
1979 deaths
People from Kingaroy
20th-century Australian politicians
Australian people of German descent
Australian farmers